Larry Reilly is a former Gaelic footballer who played for the Cavan county team.

Inter-county
The Knockbride clubman helped Cavan by scoring two points to claim their only Ulster Senior Football Championship title in 28 years, beating Derry in Clones. His older brother Peter Reilly also played in the final.

International
He played for Ireland in the 2000 International Rules Series against Australia. He scored five points over the two test games.

References

External links
 1997 Ulster Final

Year of birth missing (living people)
Living people
Cavan inter-county Gaelic footballers
Irish international rules football players